Yangxin may refer to:

 Yangxin County, Hubei (阳新县), China
 Yangxin County, Shandong (阳信县), China
 Hall of Mental Cultivation or Yangxin Hall, Forbidden City, Beijing
 Lankiam Cay in Spratly Islands in South China Sea, distantly to the south of Hainan Island of China

See also
Yang Xin (disambiguation)